The Sazliyka or Rakitnitsa (also transliterated Sazlijka or Sazliika) is a river in southeastern Bulgaria, a left tributary of the Maritsa. It originates in the Sarnena Sredna Gora mountains. In its upper course until Radnevo, it is also known as the Rakitnitsa or Syuyutliyka. The river is 121.7 kilometres in length and has a drainage basin of 3,366 square kilometres. Its average discharge at Galabovo is 17 cubic metres per second. The Galabovo Reservoir is located along the river.

The name is thought to be derived from the Ottoman Turkish saz, "bulrush", with a Bulgarian feminine suffix. The name of its upper course, Syuyutliyka, is also from a Turkish root, söğüt, "osier", while Rakitnitsa is its Bulgarian translation, the equivalent word for "osier" being rakita.

References

 
 

Rivers of Bulgaria
Landforms of Stara Zagora Province
Landforms of Plovdiv Province